Robert Christison (8 January 1837 – 25 October 1915) was a pastoralist in Australia.

Life 
Christison was born in Foulden, Berwickshire, Scotland, sixth son of Alexander Christison, Church of Scotland minister, and his first wife Helen, née Cameron. His uncle was Sir Robert Christison known for his opposition to women being educated.

Christison was educated at the local school and then migrated to Victoria in 1852 along with his brother, Tom. Initially Christison worked in Werribee, Victoria for the Chirnside brothers. He was a fine horseman and an amateur jockey. Christison thought of joining the Burke and Wills expedition but instead explored the interior with an Aboriginal friend named Barney as far as southern Queensland. He shipped horses and himself to Bowen in northern Queensland. From there he travelled inland for an area discovered by William Landsborough which was regarded as good sheep country. Christison grazed sheep there and, later, cattle.

In 1881, Christison became interested in the frozen meat trade. He went to London and formed the Australian Company Limited, which was granted a lease at Poole Island near Bowen in northern Queensland. This was the first export frozen meatworks in Queensland. However a cyclone devastated the area on 30 January 1884 and the company did not recover.

Christison sank dams on his properties and by 1900 had 40,000 cattle and 500 thoroughbred horses.

Christison published two pamphlets: United Australia and Imperial Federation (London, 1888) and The Flocks & Herds of Queensland (Brisbane, 1896).

In 1910, Christison rejoined his family after selling his interests. He died in Burrell Park in Lincolnshire in 1915. He is buried in Foulden.

References

E. M. Allingham, 'Christison, Robert (1837 - 1915)', Australian Dictionary of Biography, Volume 3, MUP, 1969, pp 394–395.

1837 births
1915 deaths
Australian pastoralists
Settlers of Australia
Scottish emigrants to colonial Australia
People from Berwickshire
Australian political writers
19th-century Australian businesspeople
Infectious disease deaths in Scotland